The Ministry of Health (MOH or MoH) is a cabinet-level ministry in the government of Brunei which oversees the health system in the country. It is currently led by a minister and the incumbent is Mohd Isham Jaafar, who took office since 1 December 2017. The ministry is headquartered in Bandar Seri Begawan.

Responsibilities 
The ministry oversees four government hospitals and 60 health centres and clinics nationwide.

As of 2017, the ministry has been responsible in enforcing 11 legislations related to public health, healthcare professionals (including dentists, midwives, nurses and pharmacists), infectious diseases,  medicines, mental health, poison, and tobacco.

The ministry manages the Brunei Healthcare Information Management System, commonly known as Bru-HIMS, the national electronic patient record system. It was introduced on 11 September 2012.

The ministry also manages BruHealth, the national personal health record smartphone app which is integrated with Bru-HIMS. It was introduced on 14 May 2020, initially as the national COVID-19 contact tracing app. Access to personal medical records was eventually introduced in the app in September in the same year.

The ministry is playing a key role in handling the spread of COVID-19 in the country.

Budget 
In the fiscal year 2022–23, the ministry has been allocated a budget of B$392 million, a 1.2 percent increase from the previous year.

Ministers

Notes

References

External links 
 

Health
Healthcare in Brunei